The Isle of Man women's cricket team is a team which represents Isle of Man in international cricket matches. The Isle of Man Cricket Association formed its first women's national team in November 2020.

In April 2018, the International Cricket Council (ICC) granted full Twenty20 International (T20I) status to all of its members. Therefore, all Twenty20 (T20) matches played between Isle of Man and other ICC members since 1 July 2018 have been eligible for full official international status. Isle of Man played their first WT20I match against Norway in November 2022 as part of the 2022 Spain Women's Pentangular Series.

Records and statistics
International match summary — Isle of Man
Last updated on 14 November 2022

Twenty20 International

T20I record against other nations

Records complete to WT20I #1303. Last updated 14 November 2022.

See also
 List of Isle of Man women Twenty20 International cricketers

References

Women's national cricket teams
Cricket in the Isle of Man
Cricket
Isle of Man in international cricket